, better known by the stage name , is a Japanese voice actress. She is most known for the roles of Dorami (Doraemon), Mami Sakura (Esper Mami), Benio Hanamura (Haikara-san ga Tōru), and Sheeta (Castle in the Sky).

Filmography
Anime
3000 Leagues in Search of Mother (Fana)
Ashita e Attack (Sumie Nishi)
Ashita e Free Kick]' (Sumie Nishi)Ashita no Joe 2 (Jun Shioya)Astro Boy (1980) (Libyan)Aura Battler Dunbine (Silky Mau)Bannertail: The Story of Gray Squirrel (Suu)Blue Seed (Yaobikuni)Castle in the Sky (Sheeta)Charlotte of the Young Grass (Charlotte)Cho Kosoku Galvion (Kei)City Hunter (Kumi)Dokaben (Kyoko Asahina)Dragon Ball (1989) (Annin)Esper Mami (Mami Sakura)Esper Mami: Hoshizora no Dancing Doll (Mami Sakura)Gauche the Cellist (Child mouse, girl with viola)Haikara-san ga Tōru (Benio Hanamura)Hokkyoku no Muushika Miishika (Yuuri)Ideon (Rin)Ippatsu Kanta-kun (Itsuko, Motsuko)Karuizawa Syndrome (Yukari Kuno)Koguma no Misha (Misha)Lady Lady!! (TV & movie) (Misuzu Midorikawa)Legend of Lemnear (Lian)Lupin III: Part II (Eri Zadora (ep.103))Meiken Jolie (Angelina)Miyuki (Koharu (ep. 19))Nichijou (Nano's Key (ep. 25))Mirai Keisatsu Urashiman (Sophia)Obake no Q-Taro (0-Jirou)Obake no Q-Taro 2 (0-Jirou)Oyoneko Boonyan (Uzura Yudeta)Patlabor (Takeo Kumagami)Paul no Miracle Daisakusen (Miina)Plastic Little (May)Seton Doubutsuki: Kuma no Ko Jacky (Jill)Shin Don Chuck Monogatari (Lala)Spoon Obasan (Jin, Little Bon, Lou)Sue Cat (Maria)The Ideon: A Contact (Lin Formosa)The Ideon: Be Invoked (Lin Formosa)The Kabocha Wine (Eru, Natsumi Asaoka)The Wonderful Adventures of Nils (Mats)Three-Eyed One - Prince in the Devile Island (Pandra)Time Bokan seriesTime Bokan (Junko (ep.34-36))YattermanZendermanTobé! Kujira no Peek (Maira)Urusei Yatsura'' (Ten's mother)

Anime: Doraemon

2112: The Birth of Doraemon (Dorami)
Doraemon (1979) (Dorami, Shizuka's mom)
Doraemon: Doraemon Comes Back (Dorami)
Doraemon: Nobita's Great Adventure in the World of Magic (Dorami)
Doraemon: The Record of Nobita's Parallel Visit to the West (Dorami)
Dorami & Doraemons: Space Land's Critical Event (Dorami)
Dorami & Doraemons: Robot School's Seven Mysteries (Dorami)
Dorami-chan: A Blue Straw Hat (Dorami)
Dorami-chan: Hello, Dynosis Kids!! (Dorami)
Dorami-chan: Mini-Dora SOS (Dorami)
Dorami-chan: Wow, The Kid Gang of Bandits (Dorami)
Doraemon: Nobita's Adventure in Clockwork City (Wicky)
Doraemon: Nobita's Dinosaur (P-suke)
It's Christmas! Doraemon & Doraemons Super Special (Dorami)

Video Games

Namco × Capcom (Roll Casket)
Rockman DASH series (Mega Man Legends series) (Roll Casket)

Dubbing Roles
Live-action
The Passage (Leah Bergson (Kay Lenz))
The Sound of Music (Liesl von Trapp (Charmian Carr))
Animation
Fun and Fancy Free (Singing Harp)
PB&J Otter (Connie Crane)

Misc
Gasshin Sentai Mechander Robo (Mika Shikishima)
Doraemon (1979) (theme song performance (ED))
Gatapishi (theme song performance (ED))
The Kabocha Wine (theme song performance (ED2))

References

External links

1952 births
Living people
Japanese video game actresses
Japanese voice actresses
Voice actresses from Niigata Prefecture
People from Niigata (city)
Tokyo Actor's Consumer's Cooperative Society voice actors
20th-century Japanese actresses
21st-century Japanese actresses